Peter McPhee may refer to:

 Peter McPhee (cricketer) (born 1963), Australian cricketer
 Peter McPhee (footballer) (born 1934), Australian rules footballer
 Peter McPhee (academic) (born 1948), Australian academic, and former Provost of the University of Melbourne